David Attwell FRS (born 1953) is a British neuroscientist, and the Jodrell Professor of Physiology at University College London in the Faculty of Life Sciences.

Life
David Ian Attwell studied physics and physiology at Magdalen College, Oxford, and earned D.Phil. in neuroscience from Oxford, where he studied with Julian Jack. He also studied at the University of California, Berkeley with Frank Werblin.

References

External links
 Professor David Attwell page on The Academy of Medical Sciences (archived)
 "David Attwell family tree", Neurotree

1953 births
Living people
British neuroscientists
Fellows of the Royal Society
Academics of University College London
Alumni of Magdalen College, Oxford
Fellows of Magdalen College, Oxford
Jodrell Professors of Physiology
Presidents of The Physiological Society